UoSAT-3, also known as UO-14 and OSCAR-14, is a British satellite in Low Earth Orbit. It was built by a spin-off company of the University of Surrey, Surrey Satellite Technology (SSTL) and launched in January 1990 from French Guiana. The satellite functioned as one of a series of OSCAR satellite in orbit around the Earth, as well as observing Earth and performing scientific experiments.

UoSAT-3 was launched on the same rocket as its sister satellite, UoSAT-4.

Current Status
UoSAT-3 exceeded its expected operational life by 3 years and ceased active service in 1999. However, amateur radio enthusiasts managed to track the satellite for a certain amount of time afterwards via the satellite's FM voice transponder.

The satellite, which is now non-operational, forms a part of the growing amounts of space debris orbiting around the Earth. The payload will decay in the Earth's atmosphere some time in the future.

References 

University of Surrey
Satellites orbiting Earth
Amateur radio satellites
Satellites of the United Kingdom
Spacecraft launched in 1990